A spy is a person engaged in espionage, obtaining information that is considered secret or confidential.

Spy or The Spy may also refer to:

Books and magazines 
 The Spy (Cooper novel), an 1821 novel by James Fenimore Cooper
 The Life of a Useless Man also known as The Spy: The Story of a Superfluous Man, a 1908 novel by Maxim Gorky
 The Spy, a 1920 novel by Upton Sinclair
 The Spy (Cussler novel), a 2010 novel by Clive Cussler and Justin Scott
 The Spy, a 2016 novel by Paulo Coelho
 The Spy (periodical by James Hogg), 1810-1811
 Spy, a novel in the Alex Hawke series by Ted Bell
 Spy: The Inside Story of How the FBI's Robert Hanssen Betrayed America
 Spy (magazine), a satirical monthly

Film 
 An English translation of the title for Spione, the 1928 silent film by Fritz Lang
 The Spy (1914 film), a 1914 American film directed by Otis Turner
 The Spy (1917 American film), a 1917 film released shortly after the United States entered World War I
 The Spy (1917 German film), directed by Karl Heiland and starring Conrad Veidt
 The Spy (1931 film), a 1931 film directed by Berthold Viertel
 The Spy (1964 film), a 1964 Egyptian film with Rufino Inglés
 The Spy, a 1999 South Korean film directed by Jang Jin
 The Spy (2012 South Korean film), a 2012 South Korean film directed by Woo Min-ho
 The Spy (2012 Russian film), a 2012 Russian dieselpunk spy film
 The Spy: Undercover Operation, a 2013 South Korean film directed by Lee Seung-joon
 Spy (2015 film), a comedy starring Melissa McCarthy
 S*P*Y*S, a 1974 comedy film

Finance 
 SPY - the ticker symbol for the SPDR S&P 500 Trust ETF, an exchange-traded fund that trades on the NYSE.

Television 
 Spy (2004 TV series), a British reality series that premiered on BBC3 in 2004
 Spy (2011 TV series), a British comedy series that premiered on Sky1 and Hulu in 2011
 Spy (2015 TV series), a South Korean action series, also stylised as SPY
 The Spy (TV series), a 2019 web television miniseries based on the life of Israel's top Mossad spy Eli Cohen

Music 
 S.P.Y (born 1976), a London-based Drum and Bass producer/DJ
 Spys (band), a New York band

Albums 
 Spy (Carly Simon album), 1979

Songs 
 "The Spy", a song on Morrison Hotel, a 1970 album by the Doors
 "Spy", a song by They Might Be Giants from the album John Henry
 "Spy", a song by Shakira featuring Wyclef Jean from the 2009 album She Wolf
 "Spy", the titular song on Carly Simon 1979 album Spy
 "Spy" (Super Junior song), a 2012 song by South Korean boy band Super Junior
 "iSpy" (Kyle song), a 2016 song by Kyle featuring Lil Yachty

People

Real people 
 Spy (1851–1922), a British cartoonist a.k.a. Leslie Ward
 Spy (born 1974/75), an American musician a.k.a. J. Ralph

Fictional characters 
 Spy (Team Fortress 2), one of the nine playable classes in the video game

Ships
 Spy (ship), several commercial ships
 HMS Spy, two ships of the Royal Navy

Other uses 
 Spy, Belgium, a village
 Northern Spy, a variety of apple
 Spy (gridiron football), a defensive football role
 SPDR S&P 500 Trust ETF (NYSE Arca: SPY)

See also 
 
 
 SPY (disambiguation)
 Spies (disambiguation)
 Spy vs. Spy, a comic strip
 Spy fiction
 The Spy Whisperer
 Grotte de Spy, a cave near the village of Spy in Belgium
 The Secret Agent (disambiguation)